The United States, represented by the United States Olympic & Paralympic Committee (USOPC), is scheduled to compete at the 2024 Summer Olympics in Paris from 26 July to 11 August 2024. U.S. athletes have appeared in every Summer Olympic Games edition of the modern era, except for Moscow 1980, where the Americans led a sixty-six-nation boycott in protest of the Soviet invasion of Afghanistan. As Los Angeles hosts the 2028 Summer Olympics, the United States will march penultimately before the homebound French team enters Place du Trocadéro during the parade of nations segment of the opening ceremony. Additionally, an American segment will be performed during the closing ceremony.

Competitors
The following is the list of number of competitors that will compete in the Games.

Athletics

U.S. track and field athletes achieved the entry standards for Paris 2024, either by passing the direct qualifying mark (or time for track and road races) or by world ranking, in the following events (a maximum of 3 athletes each):

Track and road events

Basketball

5×5 basketball
Summary

Women's tournament

The U.S. women's basketball team qualified for the Olympics by winning the gold medal and securing an outright berth at the 2022 FIBA Women's World Cup in Sydney, Australia.

Team roster
 Women's team event – one team of 12 players

Cycling

BMX
Freestyle
U.S. riders received a single quota spot each in the men's and women's BMX freestyle for Paris 2024, finishing among the top two at the 2022 UCI Urban Cycling World Championships in Abu Dhabi, United Arab Emirates.

Equestrian

U.S. equestrians entered a full squad each in their respective disciplines through a top-six finish in the team dressage at the 2022 World Championships in Herning, Denmark and a top-seven at the Eventing Worlds on the same year in Pratoni del Vivaro, Italy.

Dressage

Qualification Legend: Q = Qualified for the final based on position in group; q = Qualified for the final based on overall position

Eventing

Football

Summary

Men's tournament

For the first time since 2008, the United States men's football team qualified for the Olympics by advancing to the final match at the 2022 CONCACAF U-20 Championship in Honduras.

Team roster
 Men's team event – one team of 18 players

Women's tournament

United States women's football team qualified for the Olympics by winning the final match against the defending champion Canada at the 2022 CONCACAF W Championship in Mexico.

Team roster
 Women's team event – one team of 18 players

Gymnastics

Artistic
The United States fielded a full squad of five female gymnasts for Paris after scoring a gold-medal victory in the team all-around at the 2022 World Championships in Liverpool, Great Britain.

Women
Team

Shooting

U.S. shooters achieved quota places for the following events based on their results at the 2022 and 2023 ISSF World Championships, 2022 and 2024 Championships of the Americas, 2023 Pan American Games, and 2024 ISSF World Olympic Qualification Tournament, if they obtained a minimum qualifying score (MQS) from 14 August 2022 to 9 June 2024. The U.S. shooting squad will be named based on the aggregate scores obtained by the shooters at two stages of the 2023–2024 Olympic Trials (fall and spring).

Men

Women

Mixed

Surfing

U.S. surfers confirmed a single shortboard quota place for Tahiti, following their successful triumph in the women's team event at the 2022 ISA World Surfing Games in Huntington Beach, California.

Swimming 

U.S. swimmers achieved the entry standards in the following events for Paris 2024 (a maximum of two swimmers under the Olympic Qualifying Time (OST) and potentially at the Olympic Consideration Time (OCT)): To assure their selection to the U.S. team, swimmers must finish in the top two of each individual pool event under the Olympic qualifying cut at the 2024 United States Olympic Trials (June 15–23, 2024) in Indianapolis, Indiana.

Men

Women

See also
United States at the 2023 Pan American Games

References

External links
 
 

Nations at the 2024 Summer Olympics
2024
2024 in American sports